Fabre Hydravion is the name used in English-language sources for an originally unnamed experimental floatplane designed by Henri Fabre.  The aircraft is notable as the first to take off from water under its own power.

Development

Hydravion (French for seaplane/floatplane) was developed over a period of four years by Fabre, assisted by a former mechanic of Captain Ferdinand Ferber, named Marius Burdin, and Léon Sebille, a naval architect from Marseilles. Fabre did not initially name his machine, which in contemporary reports was referred to as an "aéroplane marin", but it subsequently came to be referred to in English common usage by the French term for the type of craft.

The aircraft was a canard configuration monoplane whose structure made extensive use of a beam design working as a spanwise spar on its wing panels and forward canard surface, patented by Fabre.  This was a Warren truss girder with all members having a streamlined section. Two of these beams, one above the other and connected by three substantial struts, formed the fuselage of the aircraft.  The wing, which had pronounced dihedral and whose leading edge was formed by an exposed Fabre beam, was mounted below the rear of the upper beam, and the Gnome Omega rotary engine driving a two-bladed pusher Chauvière propeller was mounted behind it. Additional bracing for the wings was provided by kingposts extending down from the leading edge at mid-span.  There were two small foreplanes, which, like the wing, had exposed Fabre beams forming their leading edges, one mounted above the upper beam and the second on the strut connecting the two beams. A rectangular rear-mounted rudder was situated above the wing: below the wing there was a similar rectangular fixed surface extending down to the lower fuselage beam.  The pilot sat astride the upper fuselage beam. The aircraft was equipped with three broad floats: one at the front of the aircraft, the other two mounted on struts extending down from the wing.

Fabre had no prior flying experience. The aircraft then became badly damaged in an accident.

These experiments were closely followed by aviation pioneers Gabriel and Charles Voisin. Eager to construct a seaplane, Voisin purchased several of the Fabre floats and fitted them to their Voisin Canard.

Hydravion was flown by Jean Bécue at the Concours de Canots Automobiles de Monaco, and crashed there on 12 April 1911, being damaged beyond repair. No more Hydravions were built.

Following this experience, Henri Fabre built floats for other aviation pioneers, including (as well as Voisin) Caudron, who built the Hydroaéroplane Caudron-Fabre.

Surviving examples
The restored example of the aircraft remain- the crashed Hydravion which was collected in 1922 and later restored and displayed by the  Musée de l'air et de l'espace (French Air and Space Museum) at Le Bourget (Seine-Saint-Denis), and a replica, close to the location of the initial flight, at Marseille Provence Airport in Marignane (Bouches-du-Rhône).

Specifications (October 1910)

References

The Illustrated Encyclopedia of Aircraft (Part Work 1982–1985), 1985, Orbis Publishing

External links

Contemporary report in Flight

1900s French experimental aircraft
Floatplanes
Canard aircraft
Single-engined pusher aircraft
Rotary-engined aircraft
Hydravion
Aircraft first flown in 1910